Cambarus howardi, the Chattahoochee crayfish, is a species of crayfish in the family Cambaridae. It is found in North America. The common name refers to the Chattahoochee River, where the first specimens were collected.

The IUCN conservation status of Cambarus howardi is "LC", least concern, with no immediate threat to the species' survival. This status was last reviewed in 2010.

References

Further reading

 
 
 

Cambaridae
Articles created by Qbugbot
Crustaceans described in 1969
Freshwater crustaceans of North America
Taxa named by Horton H. Hobbs Jr.